United Nations Security Council resolution 1440, adopted unanimously on 24 October 2002, after reaffirming the principles of the United Nations Charter and Resolution 1373 (2001), the Council condemned the hostage-taking at a theatre in Moscow, Russia, by Chechen militants.

The Security Council reaffirmed the need to combat threats to international peace and security caused by terrorist acts. It condemned taking of hostages in a Moscow theatre, as well as terrorist acts carried out in other countries, and demanded their immediate release. The Council expressed sympathy and condolences to the families of the victims and the Russian government and people.

The resolution called upon all states to co-operate with and provide assistance to the Russian authorities to bring the perpetrators to justice in accordance with their obligations under Resolution 1373. Finally, the Council concluded by expressing its determination to combat all forms of terrorism.

See also
 Chechen Republic of Ichkeria
 List of United Nations Security Council Resolutions 1401 to 1500 (2002–2003)
 Moscow theater hostage crisis

References

External links
 
Text of the Resolution at undocs.org

 1440
2002 in Russia
 1440
 1440
Moscow theater hostage crisis
October 2002 events
2002 in Chechnya